Tolomeo Faccendi  (8 November 1905 – 11 September 1970) was an Italian sculptor, active mainly in his native Tuscany.

Biography
He trained in the workshop of Ivo Pacini and became one of the prominent artists of the 20th-century artistic movement in Grosseto.

Faccendi participated at the 21st Venice Biennale in 1938 and at the 4th Rome Quadriennale in 1943.

He created various public sculptures in his hometown, including the puledro (1933), the cinghialino (1950), the buttero (1953), and the statue of saint Francis of Assisi (1965) next to the church of San Francesco. Faccendi sculpted the bronze religious decorations – the Christ the Redeemer, the Four Evangelists, the Via Crucis, and a Pietà – for the Basilica of Sacred Heart of Jesus in Grosseto (1954–1960).

References

Bibliography

External links

20th-century Italian sculptors
20th-century Italian male artists
Sculptors from Tuscany
1905 births
1970 deaths
People from Grosseto